The 1940 Governor General's Awards for Literary Merit were the fifth rendition of the Governor General's Awards, Canada's annual national awards program which then comprised literary awards alone. The awards recognized Canadian writers for new English-language works published in Canada during 1940 and were presented in 1941. There were no cash prizes.

There was one award in each of three established categories, which recognized English-language works only.

Winners
 Fiction: Ringuet, Thirty Acres
 Poetry or drama: E. J. Pratt, Brébeuf and His Brethren
 Non-fiction: J. F. C. Wright, Slava Bohu

References

External links
 
 

1940 in Canada
1940 literary awards
Governor General's Awards